Csesztreg Sportegyesület is a professional football club based in Csesztreg, Zala County, Hungary. The club competes in the Zala county league.

Name changes

External links
 Profile on Magyar Futball

References

Football clubs in Hungary
Association football clubs established in 1928
1928 establishments in Hungary